Maria Aparecida Pereira Anastasio (born 29 January 1961) is a Brazilian actress and TV host.

Biography 

Tássia Camargo has participated in several films, plays, serials, and telenovelas. When Camargo was 17, her career began in the theater under the tutelage of director Antunes Filho in 1978. In 2016, with the spectacle of Eugène Ionesco, she joined the stage with Edi Botelho under the direction of Ney Latorraca.

Camargo's first television role was in a telenovela from Rede Bandeirantes, where she appeared in Os Adolescentes. The actress was the first presenter of the Vídeo Show in its first year in 1983.

She has also portrayed the characters Marlene from O Salvador da Pátria, Elisa from Tieta, and Marina da Glória from Escolinha do Professor Raimundo.

In 2006, Camargo played Lucília in the telenovela Vidas Opostas in Rede Record, which won the Troféu Imprensa. However, the actress was dismissed from the station soon after, due to behavioral problems on the set of recording. She was allegedly aggressive with the production team and fought with renowned actress Jussara Freire.

Personal life 
Camargo is the mother of two boys. She was married for 11 years to musician Marinho Boffa. The marriage ended in 1996, shortly after the death of her two-year-old daughter, a victim of late congenital rubella. She started a campaign against the incorrect prognosis of the said sickness which took the life of her daughter.

Filmography

Television

Films

References

External links 

1961 births
Living people
People from Guarulhos
Actresses from São Paulo
Brazilian telenovela actresses
Brazilian film actresses
Brazilian stage actresses
Brazilian emigrants to Portugal
20th-century Brazilian actresses
21st-century Brazilian actresses
Workers' Party (Brazil) politicians